Dave Hilton Sr. (born August 29, 1940) is a Canadian former professional boxer. Hilton won a Canadian championship in three different weight divisions. He is the father of former super middleweight world champion, Dave Hilton Jr., and light middleweight world champion of boxing, Matthew Hilton.

Hilton fought between 1958 and 1976, winning 65 of his 81 fights. As a teenager, he fought as a Featherweight, winning that championship in 1959. As he developed, he gained weight and moved up in class to the Welterweight division where he fought for more than ten years. In 1971, he won the Canadian Light Middleweight championship and that same year, he earned his third title, winning the Canadian Middleweight championship.

While Dave Hilton Sr. gained recognition during his fighting career, it was as manager and trainer for his three sons that he received the most publicity, each winning a Canadian championship, and two of them winning world championships.

Over the years, the Hilton family has been plagued by troubles with the law and tragedy.

Hilton Sr. was barred from entering the United States temporarily after a discovery of past crimes.

References

1940 births
Featherweight boxers
Light-middleweight boxers
Living people
Sportspeople from New Brunswick
People from Edmundston
Welterweight boxers
Canadian male boxers